Valby Park is a park in Valby, Copenhagen. 

It serves as the Copenhagen venue for the travelling Grøn Koncert festival.

History 
The park is situated at the site of the former Valby Fælled ("Common"), which was used as landfill between 1913 and 1937. It was converted to a park between 1937 and 1939, and opened to the public on 1 September 1939. Due to fuel shortages during World War II, much of the park was dug up in 1941–42 to search for coke, though the park was re-established and expanded during 1944–52.

The park was officially designated as a protected area on 3 May 1966.

In connection with Copenhagen being the 1996 European City of Culture, 17 circular themed gardens were established in the park.

References

External links 
 Valby Park at Københavnergrøn/Copenhagen Green
 Valby Park at VisitCopenhagen
 Valbyparken at Stay.com

1939 establishments in Denmark
Parks in Copenhagen
Valby